Elizabeth (Beth) Scott is a United States Paralympian. She learned how to swim at age 5, and in college was elected as captain of her college swim team (Ball State), where she also set school records and won a conference title.  She earned a place on the Dean’s list while studying Sport Administration and Adapted Physical Education.

Beth earned 17 Paralympic medals (10 gold, 2 silver and 5 bronze) in three Paralympic Games between 1992 and 2000 (Barcelona, Atlanta and Sydney). seven world records

In 1993 and 1996, she was chosen as the USOC Blind Athlete of the Year.

References

External links 
 

Paralympic swimmers of the United States
Living people
Year of birth missing (living people)
Swimmers at the 1992 Summer Paralympics
Swimmers at the 1996 Summer Paralympics
Swimmers at the 2000 Summer Paralympics
Medalists at the 1992 Summer Paralympics
Medalists at the 1996 Summer Paralympics
Medalists at the 2000 Summer Paralympics
Paralympic bronze medalists for the United States
Paralympic silver medalists for the United States
Paralympic gold medalists for the United States
Paralympic medalists in swimming
S13-classified Paralympic swimmers
American female backstroke swimmers
American female breaststroke swimmers
American female butterfly swimmers
American female freestyle swimmers
American female medley swimmers
Ball State University alumni